Beylerbeyi 75. Yıl Stadium, also known as BoBeylerbeyi Stadium,  is a football stadium in the Beylerbeyi neighborhood of Üsküdar district in Istanbul, Turkey.

The venue was established in 1900. It is owned by the Istanbul Province Foundation Direktoriate, and run by the Beylerbeyi S.K. It underwent a restoration, and was reopened in March 2021. It has a capacity of 5,500 in one covered and two open bleachers. The artificial turf field with dimensions  is floodlight illumination.

The stadium is home ground of Beylerbeyi S.K., and Fenerbahçe S.K. women's.

International events hosted
In May 2019, the venue hosted the International women's rugby league match between Turkey and Italy.

References

Football venues in Turkey
Sports venues in Istanbul
Buildings and structures in Istanbul
Sport in Üsküdar
Sports venues completed in 2021
1900 establishments in the Ottoman Empire